Haruko Sagara (相楽 晴子, Sagara Haruko, born March 1, 1968, in Koriyama, Fukushima, Japan) is a Japanese actress and ex-idol singer in the 1980s.

She debuted in 1985 with her role as Okyo in the cult TV series Sukeban Deka II. She won the Award for Best Supporting Actress at the 11th Yokohama Film Festival for Dotsuitarunen. After some 10 movies, 20 TV series, 10 singles and 2 albums, she quit her career in 1995 to settle in Los Angeles, where she married an American, becoming Haruka Haynes. In 2008, she opened a travel agency in Hawaii.

Filmography

1985-1986 : Sukeban Deka II : Shōjo tekkamen densetsu (TV series) : 'Okyō' / Kyōko Nakamura
1986 : Koisuru Onnatachi : Teiko Shima
1987 : Sukeban Deka (movie) : Kyōko Nakamura / 'Okyō' 
1987 : Hissatsu 4: Urami harashimasu : Omitsu
1988 : Marilyn ni aitai : Rie (cameo) 
1988 : Bakayaro! I'm Plenty Mad : Shizuka Atsugi (Episode 1) 
1989 : Dotsuitarunen : Takako Kamoi
1989 : Harasu no ita hibi
1989 : Gojira vs. Biorante : TV reporter
1990 : Yonimo kimyō na monogatari (TV series) 
1990 : Maria no ibukuro : Shoko
1990 : Ruten no umi : Naoko
1990 : Saraba itoshino yakuza : Kimiko Takanashi
1991 : Kinyoubi no shokutaku (TV movie)
1991 : Shin dosei jidai : Miyako Morino
1991 : AD Bugi (TV series) : Naoko Kōsaka
1993 : If: Moshimo (TV series) 
1995 : Endless Waltz : Lily
2001 : Ashita ga aru sa (TV series) 
2002 : Ashita ga aru sa: The Movie : Sadayo Hamada  (TV movie)

Discography

Albums

First album
1986/07/01 : Bitter Kiss
Tracks
 
 Teenage of Last
  (2nd single)
 
 
 	 
  (1st single)
 Funky Monky Town
 
 
 

Second album
1990/08/29 : 
Tracks
  (9th single)
 
 
 
 
 again 	 
 
  (B side from single)
 
 
 moon-light tears

Compilation
2005/11/30 : 
Tracks Disc 1
  (1st single / from 1st album)
  (B side from 1st single)
  (2nd single / from 1st album)
  (B side from 2nd single)
  (from 1st album)
 Teenage of Last (from 1st album)
  (from 1st album)
  (from 1st album)
  (from 1st album)	 
 Funky Monky Town (from 1st album)
  (from 1st album)
  (from 1st album)
  (from 1st album)
 Seaside Mint Blue (3rd single)
  (B side from 3rd single)
  (4th single)
  (B side from 4th single)
  (5th single)
  (B side from 5th single)
Tracks Disc 2
  (6th single)
  (7th single)
  (B side from 7th single)
  (8th single)
  (B side from 8th single)
  (9th single / from 2nd album)
  (B side from 9th single / from 2nd album)
  (from 2nd album)
  (from 2nd album)
  (from 2nd album)
  (from 2nd album)
 again (from 2nd album)
  (from 2nd album)
  (from 2nd album)
  (from 2nd album)
 moon-light tears (from 2nd album)
  (10th single)

Singles

1986/05/02 : Virgin Heart
 A -  (from 1st album, Bitter Kiss)
 B - 
1986/10/10 : Odorasete Tonight
 A -  (from 1st album, Bitter Kiss)
 B - 
1987/02/05 : Seaside Mint Blue
 A - Seaside Mint Blue
 B - 
1987/05/21 : Mokuyôbi ni wa Kiss o
 A - 
 B - 
1988/02/26 : Bladerunner
 A - 
 B - 
1988/09/01 : Nemureru Nagisa no Season
 A - 
 B - 
1989/04/19 : Tokyo Marionette
 A -  
 B - 
1989/11/15 : Midnight Call
 A -  
 B - 
1990/07/25 : Kaze no Invention
 A -  (from 2nd album, Dainigakushô - Second Movement)
 B -  (from 2nd album, Dainigakushô - Second Movement)
1994/11/02 : Senaka
 A - 
 B -

References

External links 
 Official blog
 Haruko Sagara's travel agency's official site
Haruko Sagara on Idollica

Japanese women pop singers
Japanese film actresses
Japanese television actresses
Living people
1968 births
Actors from Fukushima Prefecture
Musicians from Fukushima Prefecture